In Greek mythology, Astynomus (Ancient Greek: Αστυνόμος) was a Trojan prince as one of the sons of King Priam of Troy by an unknown woman.

See also 
 List of children of Priam

Notes

References 

 Gaius Julius Hyginus, Fabulae from The Myths of Hyginus translated and edited by Mary Grant. University of Kansas Publications in Humanistic Studies. Online version at the Topos Text Project.

Characters in Greek mythology